Caught in the Game is the fourth album by American rock band Survivor, released in October 1983. It features guest appearances by Mr. Mister's Richard Page and REO Speedwagon's Kevin Cronin. It is the band's last album to-date to feature lead vocalist Dave Bickler, who left due to vocal surgery. Bickler rejoined the band from 1993 to 2000, and again from 2013 to 2016. The first single "Caught In The Game" went to #77 at Billboard Hot 100 chart and later "I Never Stopped Loving You" failed to hit the Hot 100 reaching only #104.

The hard to find 1999 Pony Canyon Japanese release on CD featured an insert with lyrics in English and Japanese and an OBI strip. The album was one of the many Survivor albums briefly taken out of print in 2009. However, it was remastered and reissued in 2010, distributed by Rock Candy Records.

Track listing
All tracks written by Jim Peterik and Frankie Sullivan, except "What Do You Really Think?" written by Peterik.

Personnel 

Survivor
 Dave Bickler – lead vocals
 Jim Peterik – keyboards, backing vocals 
 Frankie Sullivan – guitars, backing vocals 
 Stephan Ellis – bass
 Marc Droubay – drums

Additional musicians
 Daryl Dragon – additional keyboards
 Dave Arellano – additional synthesizers
 Tom Kelly – backing vocals
 Richard Page – backing vocals
 Kevin Cronin – backing vocals

Production 
 Frankie Sullivan – producer, additional engineer 
 Jim Peterik – assistant producer 
 Mike Clink – engineer
 Julian Stoll – second engineer
 Mike Reese – mastering 
 Doug Sax – mastering
 Glen Wexler – art direction, design, photography 
 Kurt Triffet – design, illustration 
 Harrison Funk – inner sleeve photos
 John Baruck Management – direction

Studios
 Recorded and Mixed at Rumbo Recorders (Los Angeles, California).
 Mastered at The Mastering Lab (Hollywood, California).

References

External links 
 Survivor- Caught in the Game @Discogs.com Retrieved 10-27-2013.

1983 albums
Survivor (band) albums
Scotti Brothers Records albums